David Young III (March 1, 1905 – December 17, 1977) was an American politician who served in the New Jersey General Assembly from 1941 to 1946 and in the New Jersey Senate from 1947 to 1953. Before his death, he resided in Boonton Township, New Jersey.

References

1905 births
1977 deaths
Majority leaders of the New Jersey Senate
Republican Party members of the New Jersey General Assembly
Republican Party New Jersey state senators
Presidents of the New Jersey Senate
20th-century American politicians